Kathmandu Medical College And Teaching Hospital (KMCTH) is a medical school located in Kathmandu the capital city of Nepal.

Established in 1997, KMC is a private medical college in Nepal. The college is permanently affiliated to Kathmandu University and fully recognised by the Medical Council of Nepal, Sri Lankan Medical Council, General Medical Council (UK) and Medical Council of India. Kathmandu Medical College Teaching Hospital has also been listed in the WHO's World Directory of Medical Schools electronic format as from June 2002. Following full recognition by NMC, KMCTH is also listed in the World Directory of Medical Schools. It was also listed in the now discontinued International Medical Education Directory (IMED). KMC is an Associate Member of the Network Towards Unity for Health (TUFH) that has its headquarters at Glent in Belgium.

Location
Kathmandu Medical College (KMC) functions from two complexes – basic sciences at Duwakot, Bhaktapur and clinical sciences at Sinamangal. The main hospital is located in Sinamangal near to The Tribhuvan International Airport. Besides a community hospital is built near the basic science campus in Duwakot. Emergency service and General OPD Service is already started in first and second floor of the 11-storeyed building of Duwakot.

Courses

 Post-Graduation
 MBBS (Bachelor of Medicine, Bachelor of Surgery)
 BDS (Bachelor of Dental Surgery)
 Bsc. in Nursing

MBBS at KMC

KMC is a private college in Nepal affiliated To KU. Many unofficial ranking of medical colleges of Nepal, puts KMC at 3rd place after one governmental and one semigovernmental institute. Around 100 students are enrolled annually among which 10 are selected from Ministry Of Education, Nepal under Scholarship category. The rest 90
are selected strictly from merit basis of KUMET exam.

The Bachelor of Medicine and Bachelor of Surgery is a four and a half-year integrated program followed by a compulsory internship training of one year. The standards and criteria adopted by KMC are in strict adherence to the requirements of Nepal Medical Council and Kathmandu University. 
The first two academic years focus on basic medical science with interdepartmental integration as well as clinical and community correlation. A holistic approach to health and health care system in Nepal is taken. The course starts in August every academic year.

Hospital
Kathmandu Medical College & Teaching Hospital (KMCTH) is situated at 184 Baburam Acharya Sadak Sinamangal, Kathmandu, Nepal.
There are 900 beds including general and cabin. KMC has 24 hours Emergency/Pathology services/X-Ray services, CT scan, ultrasound, TMT, pulmonary function testing, spirometer, colonoscopy, colposcopy, laryngoscopy, endoscopic bronchoscopy services, laparoscopy, intensive care unit, coronary care unit, neonatal intensive care unit, major and minor operation facilities – 9 operation theatres including one in emergency lab facilities are available. Newly constructed OB/Gyn operation theater and Neurosurgery operation theatre are running from 2071 BS. Special clinics like Cardiodiabetic and Well Baby Care clinics are operated. Childhood Asthma Clinic, Hemophilia Care Clinic and many other superspeciality clinic are also in operation. Complexes on sinamangal continues to expand after the addition of Dr. Pushkar Nath Pant memorial building, which houses paying OPDs, paying wards and two new fully audio visual equipped lecture halls of 150 capacity. New exterior design of the two buildings at the gate gives the hospital a different look than before.

Admission

Around 100 students are enrolled Annually for MBBS program. Candidates who have completed 17 years of age at the time of their applications and who fulfill the following criteria are eligible to apply for the MBBS programme at KMC.

Completed 10+2 years of education or Intermediate of Science (I.Sc) or equivalent, with English, Biology, Physics and Chemistry as main subjects and having secured not less than 50% marks in the subjects mentioned above put together and an overall aggregate of 50%.

or
Completed the Bachelor of Science degree (BSc) recognised by the University, with one of the following subjects viz. Physics, Chemistry, Biology and at least one other prescribed science subject of study up to the ancillary level and having scored not less than an overall aggregate of 50% marks, provided that such candidates shall have passed the earlier qualifying examination (10+2 or an equivalent examination) with the subjects of English, Biology, Physics and Chemistry.

Applications from eligible students for the MBBS programme should be made during the months of April to August each year. Resident Nepali students are required to have passed KUMET examination and should submit the application form and relevant documents to Kathmandu Medical College. Non Resident Nepali students and foreign students may forward their application together with attested copies of their testimonials addressed to the principal of Kathmandu Medical College.

PG Course in KMC
The MD (Pathology) was started from 2003. MD/MS in clinical areas Medicine, Surgery, Pediatric, Gyane/Obs and Anesthesia started from February 2009.
Newly qualified graduates of Kathmandu Medical College can sit for Part-1 examination being conducted in October and March. After passing the examination, fellowship is available at Kathmandu Medical College in five different areas. Kathmandu Medical College Teaching Hospital is recognized as a center for the training of fellowship of the college of Physicians and Surgeons of Pakistan (CPSP) in five specialties. Candidates who have passed the CPSP part-1 should apply to Kathmandu Medical College for a post at the teaching hospital. There are presently 34 slots available in the specialties concerned.

Criticism and Controversies 
Medical education in Nepal is highly controversial as many qualified students are turned away in lieu of competitive marks. Corruption is rampant with schools accepting students based on connections to established figures or illicit donations made to the school. The "hidden" tuition, as it's referred, is the additional cost of bribing officials in the education and healthy ministry with some students paying triple the tuition fees for enrollment.

Dr. Govinda KC is a staunch supporter of medical education reform in Nepal and has long advocated to break the education "mafia" present in the system.

See also

 Kathmandu University School of Medical Sciences
 Education in Nepal

References

External links
 

Education in Kathmandu
Medical colleges in Nepal
Organisations associated with Kathmandu University
1997 establishments in Nepal